Sivagangai Seemai is a 1959 Indian Tamil-language historical drama film directed by K. Shankar and written by Kannadasan. Based on the life of the Maruthu Pandiyars, the film stars S. S. Rajendran, S. Varalakshmi, Kamala Lakshmanan and M. N. Rajam. It was released on 19 May 1959.

Plot 

After the execution of Veerapandiya Kattabomman on 16 October 1799 at Kayattar, Chinna Marudhu gave asylum to Kattabomman's brother Oomadurai. The British used this reason to invade and attack Sivaganga in 1801 with a powerful army. The Maruthu Pandiyars and their allies were quite successful and captured three districts from the British. The British considered it as a serious threat to their future in India that they rushed additional troops from Britain to put down the Maruthu Pandiyars' rebellion.

Cast 

Male cast
 S. S. Rajendran as Muthazhagu
 P. S. Veerappa
 T. K. Bhagavathi
 M. K. Mustafa
 D. V. Narayanasami
 G. Muthukrishnan
 P. S. Venkatachalam
 Raja Wahab Kashmiri as Colonel Welsh
 K. M. Nambirajan
 Dakshinamurthi
 Rathnam
 Karikol Raj
 S. P. Veerasami
 S. A. G. Sami

Female cast
 S. Varalakshmi
 M. N. Rajam
 Kamala Lakshmanan as Chittu
 N. Lalitha
 Kumari Radha
 Jaya
 Sakunthala
Dance
Sayee–Subbulakshmi

Production 
The film began production under the title Oomaiyan Kottai with M. G. Ramachandran starring, but it got shelved as Ramachandran was busy with politics. The same project was revived as Sivagangai Seemai. This was Kannadasan's second home production and he wrote the film's script.

Soundtrack 
The soundtrack features 16 songs composed by Viswanathan–Ramamoorthy. Lyrics were by Kannadasan. The song "Kanavu Kanden" is set in Mukhari raga.

Release and reception 
Sivagangai Seemai was released on 19 May 1959, delayed from April. Because the majority of male characters in the film had thick moustaches, the Tamil magazine Kumudam called it "Sivagangai Meesai", with "Meesai" meaning "moustache". Kanthan of Kalki said the film was not visually appealing, and overabundant with verbosity. The film was not a success, but because of its theme and historic content, it acquired cult status in later years.

References

Bibliography

External links 
 

1950s historical drama films
1950s Tamil-language films
1950s war drama films
1959 drama films
1959 films
Epic films based on actual events
Films directed by K. Shankar
Films scored by Viswanathan–Ramamoorthy
Films set in the British Raj
Indian epic films
Indian historical drama films
Indian war drama films